The Aquarius Stream is a stellar stream located in the Milky Way Galaxy. It is so named because most of the stars in the stream lie in the direction of the Aquarius constellation. At its nearest point it is about 2000 light years from Earth; at its farthest it is about 30,000 light years away. It is the closest stellar stream to Earth yet found, and the youngest, having formed about 700 million years ago. The stream was discovered in late 2010 by a team of astronomers involved in the RAdial Velocity Experiment (RAVE) survey led by New Zealander Mary Williams.

See also
 List of stellar streams

References

External links
 The Dawning of the Stream of Aquarius in RAVE Abstract of paper published in The Astrophysical Journal

Stellar streams
Milky Way
Aquarius (constellation)